The 2017–18 USC Upstate Spartans men's basketball team represented the University of South Carolina Upstate during the 2017–18 NCAA Division I men's basketball season. The Spartans, led by first-year head coach Kyle Perry, played their home games at the G. B. Hodge Center in Spartanburg, South Carolina as members of the Atlantic Sun Conference. Perry was initially named interim coach upon head coach Eddie Payne's retirement on October 3, 2017 due to health concerns, but had the interim tag removed on October 20 and was named full-time head coach. They finished the season 7–25, 2–12 in ASUN play to finish in last place. They lost in the quarterfinals of the ASUN tournament to Florida Gulf Coast.

After the season, USC Upstate fired Perry on March 1, less than five months after being named full time head coach of the Spartans. On March 30, the school hired former Tulane head coach Dave Dickerson for the job.

This season marked the final season for USC Upstate as members of the Atlantic Sun Conference, as the school announced on November 15, 2017 that they will be moving to the Big South Conference for the 2018–19 season.

Previous season
The Spartans finished the 2016–17 season 17–16, 7–7 in ASUN play to finish in a tie for fourth place. They lost in the quarterfinals of the ASUN tournament to Kennesaw State. They were invited to the CollegeInsider.com Tournament where they lost in the first round to Furman.

The season marked Eddie Payne's 15th and final season as head coach at USC Upstate as he announced his retirement on October 3, 2017.

Offseason

Departures

Incoming transfers

2017 recruiting class

Roster

Schedule and results

|-
!colspan=9 style=| Non-conference regular season

|-
!colspan=9 style=| Atlantic Sun Conference regular season

|-
!colspan=9 style=| Atlantic Sun tournament

References

USC Upstate Spartans men's basketball seasons
USC Upstate
USC Upstate
USC Upstate